Orvieto is a city and comune in the Province of Terni, southwestern Umbria, Italy, situated on the flat summit of a large butte of volcanic tuff. The city rises dramatically above the almost-vertical faces of tuff cliffs that are completed by defensive walls built of the same stone.

History

Etruscan era
The ancient city (urbs vetus in Latin, whence "Orvieto"), populated since Etruscan times, has usually been associated with Etruscan Velzna, but some modern scholars differ. Orvieto was certainly a major centre of Etruscan civilization; the archaeological museum (Museo Claudio Faina e Museo Civico) houses some of the Etruscan artifacts that have been recovered in the immediate area. A tomb in the Orvieto Cannicella necropolis bears the inscription mi aviles katacinas, "I am of Avile Katacina"; the tomb's occupant thus bore an Etruscan-Latin first name, Aulus, and a family name that is believed to be of Celtic origin (derived from "Catacos").  This interesting artifact might show the complexity of ethnic relations in ancient Italy, and how such relations could be peaceful. Also in the area is the Golini Tomb, which was constructed in the fourth century BCE. Its wall paintings depict a funeral banquet, giving some insight into the real-life gatherings held after the deaths of aristocratic Etruscans. The pictures include scenes of servants preparing for the feast in various ways.

Roman and post-Roman eras
Orvieto was annexed by Rome in the third century BC. Because of its site on a high, steep bluff of tuff, a volcanic rock, the city was virtually impregnable.  After the collapse of the Roman Empire its defensible site gained new importance: the episcopal seat was transferred from Bolsena, and the city was held by Goths and by Lombards before its self-governing commune was established in the tenth century, in which consuls governed under a feudal oath of fealty to the bishop.  Orvieto's relationship to the papacy has been a close one; in the tenth century Pope Benedict VII visited the city of Orvieto with his nephew, Filippo Alberici, who later settled there and became Consul of the city-state in 1016. By the thirteenth century, three papal palaces had been built.

Middle Ages
Orvieto, sitting on its impregnable rock controlling the road between Florence and Rome where it crossed the Chiana, was a large town: its population numbered about 30,000 at the end of the 13th century. Its municipal institutions already recognized in a papal bull of 1157, from 1201 Orvieto governed itself through a podestà, who was as often as not the bishop, however, acting in concert with a military governor, the "captain of the people". In the 13th century bitter feuds divided the city, which was at the apogée of its wealth but found itself often at odds with the papacy, even under interdict. Pope Urban IV stayed at Orvieto from 1262 to 1264.

The city became one of the major cultural centers of its time when Thomas Aquinas taught at the studium there. A small university (now part of the University of Perugia), had its origins in a studium generale that was granted to the city by Pope Gregory IX in 1236. After teaching in Orvieto Aquinas was called to Rome in 1265 to serve as papal theologian to the newly elected Pope Clement IV, and as Regent master of the Santa Sabina studium provinciale, the forerunner of the Pontifical University of Saint Thomas Aquinas, Angelicum.

Papal rule
The territory of Orvieto was under papal control long before it was officially added to the Papal States (various dates are quoted); it remained a papal possession until 1860, when it was annexed to unified Italy.

Main sights

The Duomo

On 15 November 1290, Pope Nicholas IV laid the cornerstone for the present building and dedicated it to the Assumption of the Virgin, a feast for which the city had a long history of special devotion. The design has often been attributed to Arnolfo di Cambio, but the prevailing modern opinion is that the master mason was an obscure monk named Fra' Bevignate from Perugia. The church is striped in white travertine and greenish-black basalt in narrow bands, similar in many ways to the cathedral of Siena and other central Italian cathedrals of that era. In the following decade, cathedral authorities called Sienese architect and sculptor Lorenzo Maitani to stabilize the building and design a façade. He enlarged the choir and planned a transept with two chapels (c. 1308–1330), spaces that were not finished until long after his death. The cathedral has five bells, tuned in E flat, which date back to the renaissance.

The façade (illustration above) is particularly striking and includes some remarkable sculpture by Lorenzo Maitani (14th century). Inside the cathedral, the Chapel of San Brizio is frescoed by Fra Angelico and with Luca Signorelli's masterpiece, his Last Judgment (1449–51). The Corporal of Bolsena, on view in the Duomo, dates from a eucharistic miracle in Bolsena in 1263, when a consecrated host began to bleed onto a corporal, the small cloth upon which the host and chalice rest during the canon of the Mass.

Papal residence

From the 11th century onward, the popes maintained political presence in the papal territory which occupied central Italy. Together with his court, the pope moved from palace to palace in the manner of his European secular counterparts. Several central Italian cities hosted the pope and his retinue during the years of wandering, housing them in the bishop's palace. Outside Rome, only Orvieto and Viterbo (and eventually Avignon) had papal palaces. Pope Adrian IV (1154–59) was the first pope to spend significant time in Orvieto. His successor, Pope Innocent III (1198–1216), was a militant opponent of the Cathar heresy, which had infiltrated the city, and took measures to eradicate that heresy. In 1227, Pope Gregory IX confirmed the Dominican studium generale in Orvieto, a school of theology, and one of the first in Europe. Pope Urban IV (1261–64), a Frenchman who was crowned in the Dominican church in Viterbo and who spent most of his papacy in Orvieto, also left important legacies in the city. In 1263, he began a papal palace, perhaps the first outside Rome, and consecrated the new Dominican church in Orvieto. Pope Nicholas IV (1288–92) chose Orvieto over his hometown of Rome as seat of the Curia in 1291–92, establishing the meeting of the Curia in Orvieto as a tradition. He was rewarded by the Orvietans by being elected Podestà and Capitano del Popolo, the first pope to hold civic offices in the city.

His successor Pope Boniface VIII (1294–1303) continued the papal tie to Orvieto. Although often criticized by historians for nepotism and greed, the Orvietans were recipients of the pope's generosity, and honored Boniface by electing him city Capitano and Podestà in 1297 and Capitano again in 1298. He built the third and final Palazzo Papale, Palazzo Soliano. He also donated statues of himself at the main city gates, which earned him some criticism from his many enemies. Benedict XI (1288–1305) was the last pope to live in Italy before the Avignon papacy. During the years from Nicholas IV until Benedict XI Orvieto hosted the pope more frequently than Rome, and discussions continued as to whether or not Rome should remain the papal city. Pope Nicholas V (1447–55) gave support to the city. In a letter of 1449, the pope gave money for the restoration of the episcopal palace that originally had been a project of Nicholas IV. He also allowed Fra Angelico to begin painting in the Cappella Nuova of the cathedral.

During the sack of Rome in 1527 by the Holy Roman Emperor Charles V, Pope Clement VII took refuge at Orvieto. Fearing that in the event of siege by Charles's troops the city's water might prove insufficient, he commissioned a spectacular 62 meter deep well, the Pozzo di San Patrizio or "Well of St. Patrick". This Italian name, inspired by medieval legends that St. Patrick's Purgatory in Ireland gave access down to Purgatory, was used to indicate something very deep. The construction was by the architect-engineer Antonio da Sangallo the Younger. The central well shaft was surrounded by ramps in a double helix, similar to Saladin's Well. These ramps were each designed for one-way traffic, so that mules laden with water-jars might pass down and then up unobstructed. An inscription on the well boasts that QUOD NATURA MUNIMENTO INVIDERAT INDUSTRIA ADIECIT ("what nature stinted for provision, application has supplied").

Underground tunneling system

The city of Orvieto has long kept the secret of its labyrinth of caves and tunnels that lie beneath the surface. Dug deep into the tuff, a volcanic rock, these secret hidden tunnels are now open to view only through guided tours. Their spectacular nature has also yielded many historical and archeological finds. Saint Anselm College has set up a program where each summer, students travel to Italy to work at the college's archaeology site located at the Coriglia excavation site, just outside town.

The underground city boasts more than 1200 tunnels, galleries, wells, stairs, quarries, cellars, unexpected passageways, cisterns, superimposed rooms with numerous small square niches for pigeon roosts, detailing its creation over the centuries. Many of the homes of noble families were equipped with a means of escape from the elevated city during times of siege through secret escape tunnels carved from the soft rock. The tunnels would lead from the city palazzo to emerge at a safe exit point some distance away from city walls.

Palazzo del Capitano del Popolo

Work on the construction of the Palazzo del Capitano del Popolo began in the 13th century on an area that had been occupied since 1157 by the papal palace built under the reign of Pope Hadrian IV. The original Palazzo del Capitano was a single ground-floor loggia that was used as a market place or for meetings, from which the magistrate would speak to the citizens. This was where the surrounding lords or representatives of vanquished cities came to pay their allegiance to Orvieto.

The structure was enlarged within ten years of its original construction and, in 1315, the bell tower was added and in the subsequent year, a great bell was hung there. The upper part of the structure was covered in 1472 and the large hall divided into two rooms, one large and the other small. The larger of the two occupied an area that corresponds approximately to the room known today as the Sala dei Quattrocento. Subsequently, the building functioned as a residence for the Capitano del Popolo, the Podestà and the Signori Sette.

From 1596 one of the lower-section rooms housed the Studium, which had been re-instituted a few years earlier by Lorenzo Magalotti. Students of law, theology and logic came here to study twice a day, each time the bell of Palazzo del Popolo rang, until 1651. Few records of this university appear after this date. Some sources indicate that it dates back to 1013 and had connections with names such as the Benedictine monks Graziano and Gozio of Orvieto.

The Albornoz fortress

In Piazza Cahen stands the Fortezza dell'Albornoz. It was built by order of the Spanish Cardinal Albornoz under orders from Pope Innocent VI and designed by condottiero and military engineer Ugolino di Montemarte. The Albornoz fortress stands on an area that was once occupied by a temple known by the Latin name Augurale.

Originally known as the Rocca di San Martino, construction on this massive fortress started either in 1359 or 1353 near the town's cemetery. Its aim was to provide the church a secure site in the city and allow the cardinal and his captains to consolidate recent military victories.

In its original square plan the fortress was flanked by a small building near the main entrance and surrounded by a moat, crossed by a drawbridge. However, the Rocca was almost completely razed to the ground in 1395 and successive attempts to rebuild it were unsuccessful. The fortress was finally rebuilt during the mid-15th century, using original plans and an additional circular line of fortifications.

After the sack of Rome at the end of 1527 Pope Clement VII took refuge in Orvieto. To ensure that the city would be sufficiently supplied with water in the event of a siege, he gave orders for the digging of the now famous artesian well Pozzo di San Patrizio (1528–1537). For added security, the pope ordered that a second well be dug to supply the fortress alone.

Others
San Giovenale, built in 1004, probably over a pre-existing church, is the oldest church in Orvieto. Contains many 13th-century frescos.
San Domenico, one of the first Dominican churches.
San Francesco (1266), a former Franciscan church.
Orvieto is also home to Etruscan ruins and the remnants of a wall that enclosed the city more than 2000 years ago. At the foot of the butte, surrounded by peach and apple trees and a vineyard, the Etruscan necropolis of Crocefisso di Tufo numbers a hundred or so chamber tombs laid along a rectangular street grid.

Economy

The white wine of the Orvieto district, to the northeast of the city, is highly prized; red wines are also grown. Orvieto is a member of Cittaslow, the slow food movement. Orvieto has many restaurants. One of Orvieto's specialty dishes is truffle pasta.  Italian bank Cassa di Risparmio di Orvieto was based in the city. Orvieto ware, tin-glazed earthenware (maiolica) was originally manufactured at Orvieto, where it has been produced since the 13th century.

Transport
The Orvieto funicular provides a link from Orvieto to the historic city centre.

Since December 2016 Orvieto station has been served by Austrian railways ÖBB overnight sleeper services to Munich and Vienna.

Pop culture
Orvieto is one of the main locales of Sign of the Cross, the international bestseller by Chris Kuzneski. The novel features the Cathedral of Orvieto, St. Patrick's Well, and many other local sites.

Miscellaneous
The patron saint of Orvieto is Saint Joseph.

Alongside Saint Anselm College, Orvieto also hosts a study abroad program with the University of Arizona founded by David Soren (archaeologist), and run by Dr. Claudio Bizzari, Alba Frascarelli, and Rosita Focarelli.

Notable natives
Anna Gili, designer and artist
Matthew DeSimone, career loss leader in Whiffle Ball
Erminia Frezzolini, operatic soprano
Stefano Tilli, athlete
 Hands of Time (HOT), Italian Hard Rock band

Twin towns – sister cities

Orvieto is twinned with:
 Bethlehem
 Givors, France
 Maebashi, Japan
 Aiken, United States
 Seinäjoki, Finland
 Kercem, Malta

References

Further reading
Bell, Sinclair and Alexandra A. Carpino, eds. 2016. A Companion to the Etruscans. Blackwell Companions to the Ancient World. Chichester: John Wiley & Sons. 
Castagnoli, Donata. 2013. "The Wine-Producing Territory of Orvieto." Journal of Wine Research 24 (4): 253–63.
Donati, Roberto. 1986. Orvieto: Art, History, Folklore. Narni, Italy: Plurigraf.
George, David B., and Claudio Bizzarri. 2015. "A field report of the excavations of Cavità 254 in Orvieto (2012–2014)." Etruscan Studies 18 (1): 40–53.
Haynes, Sybille. 2000. Etruscan civilization: A cultural history. Los Angeles: J. Paul Getty Museum.
James, Sara Nair. 2003. Signorelli and Fra Angelico at Orvieto: Liturgy, Poetry, and a Vision of the End-Time. Aldershot, UK: Ashgate.
Pallottino, Massimo. 1978. The Etruscans. Bloomington: Indiana University Press.
Riess, Jonathan B., and Luca Signorelli. 1995. The Renaissance Antichrist: Luca Signorelli's Orvieto Frescoes. Princeton: Princeton University Press.
Sprenger, Maia, and Gilda Bartoloni. 1983. The Etruscans: Their history, art and architecture. Translated by Robert E. Wolf. New York: Harry N. Abrams.
Turfa, Jean MacIntosh, ed. 2013. The Etruscan World. Routledge Worlds. Abingdon, UK: Routledge.

External links

Official Site
Orvieto profile, Thayer's Gazetteer of Umbria; accessed 26 March 2015. 
Duomo of Orvieto, InItaly.com; accessed 26 March 2015. 
Soprintendenza per i Beni Archeologici dell' Umbria National Archaeological Museum of Orvieto, eng.archeopg.arti.beniculturali.it; accessed 26 March 2015. 
Different views of Orvieto, AdventuresInItaly.net; accessed 26 March 2015. 
Orvieto Official website on tourism, inorvieto.it; accessed 26 March 2015.

 
Cittaslow
Hilltowns in Umbria
Wine regions of Italy
Volcanoes of Italy
Volcanic plugs of Italy
Castles in Italy